Nicolas Le Goff  (born 15 February 1992) is a French professional volleyball player. He is a member of the France national team. The 2020 Olympic Champion, 2015 European Champion, and a two–time World League winner (2015, 2017). At the professional club level, he plays for Montpellier Volley.

Honours

Clubs
 CEV Cup
  2015/2016 – with Berlin Recycling Volleys

 National championships
 2015/2016  German Cup, with Berlin Recycling Volleys
 2015/2016  German Championship, with Berlin Recycling Volleys
 2018/2019  German Championship, with Berlin Recycling Volleys
 2019/2020  German SuperCup, with Berlin Recycling Volleys
 2019/2020  German Cup, with Berlin Recycling Volleys
 2021/2022  French Championship, with Montpellier Volley

Youth national team
 2009  CEV U19 European Championship

Individual awards
 2021: French Championship – Most Valuable Player
 2021: French Championship – Best Middle Blocker

State awards
 2021:  Knight of the Legion of Honour

References

External links

 
 Player profile at LegaVolley.it 
 
 
 Player profile at Volleybox.net 

1992 births
Living people
Volleyball players from Paris
French men's volleyball players
Olympic volleyball players of France
Volleyball players at the 2016 Summer Olympics
Volleyball players at the 2020 Summer Olympics
Olympic medalists in volleyball
Olympic gold medalists for France
Medalists at the 2020 Summer Olympics
French expatriate sportspeople in Germany
Expatriate volleyball players in Germany
French expatriate sportspeople in Turkey
Expatriate volleyball players in Turkey
French expatriate sportspeople in Italy
Expatriate volleyball players in Italy
Middle blockers